The 1999 Nigerian Senate election in Katsina State was held on February 20, 1999, to elect members of the Nigerian Senate to represent Katsina State. Abdul Yandoma representing Katsina North, Samaʼila Mamman representing Katsina Central and Mohammed Tukur Liman representing Katsina South all won on the platform of the Peoples Democratic Party.

Overview

Summary

Results

Katsina North 
The election was won by Abdul Yandoma of the Peoples Democratic Party.

Katsina Central 
The election was won by Samaʼila Mamman of the Peoples Democratic Party.

Katsina South 
The election was won by Mohammed Tukur Liman of the Peoples Democratic Party.

References 

February 1999 events in Nigeria
Kat
Katsina State Senate elections